10 Cassiopeiae (10 Cas) is a blue-white giant star in the constellation Cassiopeia, about 960 light years away.

10 Cassiopeiae is a B9 giant star.  It shows emission lines in its spectrum and is classified as a Be star.  It shows slight variations in its brightness, between magnitudes 5.54 and 5.59.

At an age of 218 million years, 10 Cassiopeiae has expanded away from the main sequence after exhausting its core hydrogen and now has a radius about eight times that of the Sun.

References

B-type giants
Cassiopeia (constellation)
Cassiopeiae, 10
0007
000144
000531
BD+63 2107
Be stars
Suspected variables